S.C.I.E.N.C.E. is the second album by the American rock band Incubus, released on September 9, 1997, by Epic/Immortal Records. It has been certified Gold by the RIAA, and is the second and final Incubus release to feature Gavin Koppell (known as DJ Lyfe), who first appeared on the 1997 Enjoy Incubus EP.

At times it has been considered the band's proper debut album, due to the independent nature of their previous full-length release Fungus Amongus.

Background

Production
After recording their independent debut album Fungus Amongus, Incubus signed a seven-record deal with Epic Records/Sony-affiliated Immortal Records. An EP titled Enjoy Incubus was released by Epic/Immortal at the beginning of 1997, and Incubus would go on a European tour with labelmates Korn for the next few months. With Enjoy Incubus, the label's strategy was to build the band's fanbase through touring rather than radio airplay. Their first full-length major label effort S.C.I.E.N.C.E. was recorded during May–June 1997. Singer Brandon Boyd said "S.C.I.E.N.C.E. was done in six weeks at 4th Street Recording, a very small, charming studio in Santa Monica. Very different experience, but very important on this band's existence." During the recording, the band utilized older analogue gear that they described as having "phat sounds and spider webs." Incubus chose Jim Wirt to produce the album, since he had worked with them on earlier recordings. Guitarist Mike Einziger believed that Wirt helped encourage their creativity during the recording of S.C.I.E.N.C.E., saying in 1997, "he helps us come up with strange stuff and he likes it when we do. He doesn't try to change what we do, he tries to enhance it." He also said, "when we signed our record deal and started working on this album, we were worried that someone would come along and tell us to hold back, and try and make our songs a little more palatable. But that never happened. They kinda just said, 'do whatever you want'. With that kind of support, we just let everything kind of run wild."

When S.C.I.E.N.C.E. was in the process of being recorded and mastered, the band went on some local mini-tours, in addition to appearing on the soundtrack for the movie Spawn. The soundtrack was released on July 29, 1997, by Epic/Immortal, and featured a collaboration with DJ Greyboy called "Familiar".

Musical style and influences
S.C.I.E.N.C.E. incorporates elements of multiple genres, including heavy metal, electro, funk, jazz, hip hop and techno. According to Rolling Stone writer Rob Kemp, S.C.I.E.N.C.E. "links funk metal to the rap-metal". "Magic Medicine", described as a trip hop track, samples a recorded reading of a children's book. Though sometimes retrospectively associated with it, the term nu metal was not yet in usage when S.C.I.E.N.C.E. was released, but rather terms such as alternative metal, funk metal and rap metal. At the time, Boyd said, "people are real quick to put labels on music, so I'm sure they're going to do that with us. But we think we're doing something cool, and judging from the responses that we've gotten from all over the world, others do too." Einziger has since stated that Incubus were not part of the same Southern Californian scene as bands like Korn and System of a Down during their independent years, despite having similar influences.

The album as a whole has been labelled as a "weed-and-mushrooms influenced funk/metal freakout." Revolver describe singer Brandon Boyd as vocally "drawing on the eccentric funk-rap" of Faith No More, Primus and Red Hot Chili Peppers." They consider him to have a "goofy yet also badass presence" on S.C.I.E.N.C.E. Boyd has cited Faith No More's vocalist Mike Patton as being an influence from since he was an early teenager, as well as Patton's side project Mr. Bungle, who were also known for mixing a wide array of genres. The band also became interested in emerging forms of electronic music around the making of S.C.I.E.N.C.E., with their previous full-length album Fungus Amongus having no influence from electronic genres. While playing at European festivals with Korn during early 1997, they recall being exposed to foreign electronic acts such as The Chemical Brothers.

Songs
About the opening song "Redefine", Boyd said in 1997:

On the single "New Skin", he further elaborated:

The song "Favorite Things", according to Boyd, related to the topic of religion:

While recording "Nebula", Boyd said, "we found out what it's like to actually plug a phaser pedal into the wall while it's on. It sounds like a laser gun, and that's the first sound you hear in 'Nebula'." He added that for the song, "we used these walkie-talkies for children that have this Slinky-like coil between them. When you talk through them and hit the coil, it makes this natural reverb, like talking in another dimension."

Title
In 1997, Einziger claimed that the title reflected the experimental nature of the album, and the creative freedom the band were given. He was quoted as saying, "our album is called S.C.I.E.N.C.E. because we were able to experiment. We were able to take our time and get everything to sound the way we wanted it to — weird science and energetic funk." It has also been mentioned by various band members that the acronym S.C.I.E.N.C.E. stands for Sailing Catamarans Is Every Nautical Captain's Ecstasy. "Sometimes, we just sit around and come up with these for laughs.  In other words, there's not just one meaning, it's just food for thought," said singer Brandon Boyd in 1998. In other early interviews, band members claimed that the title stood for Stupid Cops Invade Everyone's Natural Chaotic Energy, Sounds Cool in Eyes Near Communistic Entities and Surreal Cats in Economics Never Communicate Estacticly.

Touring
Shortly before the release of S.C.I.E.N.C.E., Incubus played a handful of shows with rap rock bands Phunk Junkeez and Shootyz Groove. To support the album, Incubus went on tour with 311 and Sugar Ray for the remainder of 1997. Incubus were initially only meant to perform on the first leg of this tour, but the response to them was so great that they were asked to stay for the rest of the tour. In February 1998, DJ Lyfe was fired by the band, and was replaced by DJ Chris Kilmore. The reasoning given for his firing was because of creative and personal differences, and because Incubus could no longer be a "productive family" with him in it. Kilmore was then a resident of Harrisburg, Pennsylvania, and was recommended by a friend of the band. The other members were impressed with Kilmore's style and attitude towards life, with Einziger saying at the time, "after letting go of Gavin, I wasn't even sure if I wanted to acquire another member into the band, but then we met Chris and my opinion instantly changed." In 1998, the new lineup played shows with Far, Limp Bizkit and British band One Minute Silence, in addition to performing at the 1998 edition of Ozzfest, and at the inaugural edition of Korn's Family Values Tour. Boyd found out that his long time girlfriend was having an affair while he was away on tour for S.C.I.E.N.C.E., inspiring some of the lyrical themes for Incubus's next album Make Yourself, which was noted for having a more melodic sound.

Regarding the change in direction on Make Yourself, Kilmore reflected in 2002, "I think what it was when we were touring behind S.C.I.E.N.C.E. was seeing all these other bands out there who were ripping off bands like Korn and the Deftones and 311, bands that we enjoy and that we love, I think when we realized that and we went into the studio to write Make Yourself, we said 'OK, let's not do that.'" Kilmore also recalls that, "during S.C.I.E.N.C.E. our crowd was all teenage kids wearing black and they were all men. Once 'Pardon Me' started getting some traction the crowd turned into half-girl crowds. Then when 'Stellar' and 'Drive' came out, those half-girl crowds became all screaming teenage girls in the front row." Einziger stated, "It was a very masculine time in music and we were associated with that. We would be playing Ozzfest tours with all these different bands who were our good friends and there was pressure to be like that. I think the tenderness and emotional side of the [later] music was a reaction to all that aggressive music that was happening at that time. Our reaction was to go in the other direction." According to Boyd it "felt a little strange to be associated with some of the bands around that time who were very 
deeply misogynistic in their content and vibrationally kind of violent."

Release and reception

In early 1999, S.C.I.E.N.C.E. and Enjoy Incubus were estimated to have sold a combined total of 200,000 units. Following their commercial breakthrough on Make Yourself, sales for S.C.I.E.N.C.E. began to increase. By 2001, it had sold 370,000 units in the United States. Epic/Immortal released a remastered version of the album during November 2001, and in the next year sales rose to 500,000.

Critics wrote favorably of the album's diverse style. Pitchfork state that Incubus "successfully combines all sorts of [music genres] without sounding like a mess". AllMusic reviewer David Thomas wrote that "the numerous styles on the album don't always blend perfectly, but they create a solid sound that defines the band. Incubus also manages to make their songs upbeat and danceable as well as tunes to headbang to. An admirable feat in a genre that tends to reward decibel levels instead of quality."

On April 11, 1998, Darren Kerr of the Vancouver publication Drop D praised the album's incorporation of turntablism and trip hop. Kerr also noted similarities between Faith No More, who would announce their breakup just nine days later, writing "I would not dispute that Brandon of the Jungle's evil-lounge-singer-morphing-into-teeth-gnashing-maniac vocal style is emulative of Mike Patton. I also would not argue that a couple of these songs would not sound out of place alongside FNM tracks like 'Caffeine' or 'The Gentle Art of Making Enemies'. However, guitarist Michael Einzinger and bassist Alex Katunich are mining a groove vein uniquely their own." CMJ New Music Report wrote in their September 1997 review that, "you've heard this kind of hip hop/metal fusion from bands like Faith No More, Living Colour, Rage Against the Machine and Biohazard, but Incubus has got a bit more funk in its trunk than any of those artists." They noted the album "distinguishes itself from run-of-the-mill surf/skate metal by including a real live DJ (DJ Lyfe) who thrashes as hard on the turntable as the rest of the guys." The review goes on to state that the band manages to create "monstrous riffs",  saying "S.C.I.E.N.C.E.'''s most memorable songs are the ones in which Incubus proudly bares its metal muscles." Spin in 1998 pointed out not only the band's usage of turntables, but also their usage of the didgeridoo and djembe instruments, which originate from Indigenous Australia and West Africa. In his August 1998 review, Jason Hradil of The Lantern wrote that Boyd has "an intense voice similar to Faith No More's Mike Patton." He further wrote, "Incubus changes tempo and style at least two to three times per song" and "one thing I'll guarantee, is that these young men will bring home their report cards with an 'A' in science."

The song "vitamin" was featured on the soundtrack of the movie Final Destination 2, released in 2003.

Legacy and accolades
Dylan P. Gadino of CMJ New Music Monthly reflected in November 2001 that Incubus "dropped their major-label debut, S.C.I.E.N.C.E., the same year as some nix-metal founders — 1997 also saw the releases of Limp Bizkit's Three Dollar Bill, Y'all and Sevendust's eponymous disc — yet Incubus's music [was] generally more inspired and layered than the efforts of their brooding counterparts." In November 2001, Amy Sciarretto of sister publication CMJ New Music Report further wrote, "Incubus was poised to be hard rock's bastard child of Faith No More and Primus thanks to its resident hottie Brandon Boyd's easy-on-the-ears emulation of Mike Patton and Dirk Lance's bass thwapping. But between 1997's S.C.I.E.N.C.E. and 1999's Make Yourself, the album that broke Incubus at rock radio, the band took a stylistic turn." Akex Ogg's 2003 book The Rough Guide to Rock claimed that S.C.I.E.N.C.E. was "better and far more accomplished" than their previous releases Enjoy Incubus and Fungus Amongus. He additionally states that it "gave the band a much smoother, groove-oriented sound. Splashes of funk were offset with driving riffage and spiky turntable shrapnel, while Boyd's lyrics began to encompass a more intellectual world-view than your average rock star." In 2004, David Clayman of IGN called it "fairly impressive, considering the band's age and experience at the time of those recordings", while the Daily Collegian described it as an "unheralded classic" that same year. Vice in 2013 considered it to be their heaviest album, as well as "what a more elastic and bold Red Hot Chili Peppers could be like." Loudwire stated in 2019 that S.C.I.E.N.C.E. was "Incubus at their creative peak, and at their most insane", further adding, "before their music almost entirely mellowed out, Incubus were a high energy genre-bending band of misfits. The sophomore effort fused metal, hip-hop, trip-hop, funk, jazz and even a little bit of house music."

VH1 ranked the album tenth on their 2015 list of "The 12 Most Underrated Nu Metal Albums". In 2020, Louder Sound listed it as being one of the best metal albums released between 1996 and 1997, and also included it in another list of the top 10 albums of 1997. When ranking Incubus's discography in 2020, Kerrang! placed S.C.I.E.N.C.E. third, remarking, "for fans of the band’s heavier, zanier leanings, this remains the high bar against which Incubus releases are now measured. Given the subsequent departures from this template, however, it’s likely those early adopters have been left disappointed. You could therefore argue that S.C.I.E.N.C.E. is something of a creative albatross around the band’s neck." Revolver included it on a 2021 list of the "20 Essential Nu-Metal Albums", and claimed that even when compared to the band's later work, the songs on S.C.I.E.N.C.E. were still "no less hooky and full of refreshingly good vibes." New Fury Media in 2021 called it "the genre-hopping album that put Incubus on the map" and remarked it is, "a quantum leap in musical and songwriting quality. It’s a huge difference what just two years can have on musicians, especially when the band was as young as Incubus was at the time." They add, "it’s still inspired by bands and albums that came before, like Mother's Milk and Faith No More’s Angel Dust [but] that doesn’t mean Incubus don’t blaze their own trail."

Rush's Geddy Lee was a fan of the album, and at one point expressed interest in collaborating with Incubus.

The band's greatest hits releases The Essential Incubus (2012) and Playlist: The Very Best of Incubus (2013) both include songs from the album, while their initial greatest hits release Monuments and Melodies (2009) only included an acoustic version of "A Certain Shade of Green", which was not recorded during the S.C.I.E.N.C.E. era.

Live performance
Incubus did not often perform songs from S.C.I.E.N.C.E. between the mid-2000s and early 2010s, with Boyd telling Spin in 2017, "there was a period of years when we were knowingly rebelling against it, we were desperately trying to shake off the identity it had created around us. Our original fans would get mad, 'Why don’t you play more stuff from S.C.I.E.N.C.E.''?' I think it only happened two or three years ago, when we were touring again, and started to revisit the songs casually in rehearsal studios and sound checks. We started to fall in love with them again. I think we just needed a friend break." He also said there are "tracks that are just kind of ridiculous, that we don’t really fuck with. One day we might."

Track listing

"Calgone" ends at 5:12; the hidden track "Segue 1" begins at 5:42
"Segue 1" is also known as "Jose Loves Kate Moss, Part 1"

Personnel
Incubus
 Cornelius – lead vocals, percussion
 Jawa – guitar, backing vocals
 Dirk Lance – bass
 DJ Lyfe – turntables, keyboards
 Badmammajamma – drums

Additional
 Charles Waltz – violin 
 Jeremy Wasser – saxophone on "Summer Romance (Anti-Gravity Love Song)"
 Jim Wirt – producer
 Ulrich Wild – engineer
 CJ Eiriksson – engineer
 Donat Kazarinoff – engineer
 Matthew Kallen – assistant engineer
 Terry Date – mixing
 Stephen Marcussen – mastering, remastering 
 Frank Harkins – art direction
 Chris McCann – photography

Year-end charts

Certifications

References

1997 albums
Incubus (band) albums
Epic Records albums
Nu metal albums by American artists